Moby Duck may refer to:
 Moby Duck (Disney), a Disney cartoon character
 Moby Duck (film), a 1965 Warner Bros. animated film short
 The Seafair Pirates' ship
 Moby-Duck: The True Story of 28,800 Bath Toys Lost at Sea and of the Beachcombers, Oceanographers, Environmentalists, and Fools, Including the Author, Who Went in Search of Them, a 2011 book by Donovan Hohn